Llama was an American alternative rock band from Nashville, Tennessee. Formed by high school friends Ben Brown, Neil Mason, Ben Morton, and Matthew Stewart, they were discovered while playing a concert in a local pizzeria. Then called the Dahlia Llamas, they were signed to a contract with MCA Records and changed their name to Llama while the three original members of the band were still in high school.

History
The band's first album, Close to the Silence, was recorded over two years as the members completed high school. Upon its release in 2001 it garnered critical comparisons to the Dave Matthews Band. Llama spent the majority of 2001 touring with acts as varied as Béla Fleck, O.A.R., and Blueground Undergrass. Their second release, the EP The World from Here, was released in 2002.

Llama broke up in 2003, but the former members are still active in the Nashville music scene. Neil Mason and Ben Brown combined with former members of The Kicks to form the band Bang Bang Bang (later renamed American Bang and signed to Warner Bros. Records). Ben Morton now plays in Nashville-based rock band Cougar Fight; Ian Fitchuk has formed a partnership with fellow musician Justin Loucks, and Adam Binder has toured with Eliot Morris and is currently playing bass in Nashville-based singer-songwriter Jeremy Lister's band. Neil Mason along with other members of American Bang formed The Cadillac Three.

Discography

Albums
Close to the Silence, 2001, MCA Records

EPs
The World from Here, 2002, MCA Records

Additional Links
The Pitch Interview with Ben Morton, 2001
The Daily Gamecock Interview with the band, 2001

Jam bands
Musical groups from Nashville, Tennessee
MCA Records artists
Musical groups established in 1996
Musical groups disestablished in 2003
Alternative rock groups from Tennessee